Joseph Oscar Giard (October 7, 1898 – July 10, 1956) was an American major league baseball pitcher.

Born in Ware, Massachusetts, Giard played two seasons for the St. Louis Browns, chiefly as a starter, before being traded (along with outfielder Cedric Durst) for pitcher Sad Sam Jones in February 1927; Giard was therefore a member of the 1927 New York Yankees, a team often considered the greatest ever. He pitched 27 innings in 16 games, all in relief, for the Yankees that year, with an ERA of 8.00.

Giard died in Worcester, Massachusetts, on July 10, 1956.

References

External links

Joe Giard at Baseball Almanac

Major League Baseball pitchers
New York Yankees players
St. Louis Browns players
Baseball players from Massachusetts
1898 births
1956 deaths
Toledo Mud Hens players
Newark Bears (IL) players
St. Paul Saints (AA) players
San Antonio Indians players
Columbus Senators players